George Thorpe may refer to:

 George Thorpe (cricketer, born 1781) (1781–1847), English cricketer
 George Thorpe (cricketer, born 1834) (1834–1899), English cricketer
 George Thorpe (footballer) (1910–1985), English footballer for Leeds United, Huddersfield Town and Chester City
 George C. Thorpe (1875–1936), American officer in the United States Marine Corps
 George Thorp (Royal Navy officer) (1777–1797), Royal Navy officer killed at the Battle of Santa Cruz de Tenerife
 George Thorpe (Virginia colonist) (1576–1622), Virginia colonist and Berkeley Hundred co-founder